Elizabeth Cook (born July 18, 1972) is an American country music singer and radio host. She has made over 400 appearances on the Grand Ole Opry since her debut on March 17, 2000, despite not being a member. Cook, "the daughter of a hillbilly singer married to a moonshiner who played his upright bass while in a prison band", was "virtually unknown to the pop masses" before she made a debut appearance on the Late Show with David Letterman in June 2012. The New York Times called her "a sharp and surprising country singer" and an "idiosyncratic traditionalist".

Early life
The youngest of 12 children, Cook was born in Wildwood, Florida. Her mother, Joyce, played mandolin and guitar and performed on radio and local television. Her father, Thomas, also played string instruments. He honed his skills playing upright bass in the Atlanta Federal Penitentiary prison band while serving time for running moonshine. In prison he learned welding; Cook would name her 2010 album Welder. After his release from prison, he and Joyce began playing together in local country bands. Elizabeth was onstage with them when she was 4, singing material like songwriter John Schweers' "Daydreams About Night Things", a 1975 hit for Ronnie Milsap. She formed a band when she was 9.

Cook graduated from Georgia Southern University in 1996 with dual degrees in Accounting and Computer Information Systems.

Career
Cook moved to Nashville, Tennessee in 1996 to work for PricewaterhouseCoopers. She got a publishing deal and ended up sleeping on the floor of the publishing house for three years while she worked on honing her craft, with The Blue Album, which contained demo recordings she had made in Nashville, finally being released in 2000. She cut her major-label debut, 2002's Hey Y'all, for Atlantic Records.  Hey Y'all wasn't a success. After taking a shot at co-writing,  Cook  asked to be released from her contract. A proposed deal with Sony Records subsequently fell through.

She released 2004's This Side of the Moon, which was eventually picked up by record label Thirty Tigers. It received positive reviews from The New York Times and No Depression. Produced by Rodney Crowell, Balls, which included a song Cook had written with songwriter Melinda Schneider, "Sometimes It Takes Balls to Be a Woman", was released in May 2007. Welder featured appearances by Dwight Yoakam, Crowell and Buddy Miller.

Cook toured in America, as well as in South Korea, Japan, Norway, Sweden, Poland, France and the UK. She appeared at the Cambridge Folk Festival, the Maverick Festival and the Borderline in London. She has continued to play the Grand Ole Opry, making over 400 appearances—the most by a non-member of the radio show.

She toured the UK in support of Welder, performing 18 dates with her then-husband, guitarist and songwriter Tim Carroll, and her upright bass player Bones Hillman, formerly of Midnight Oil.

Cook was invited by the Atlanta Braves to sing the national anthem before their 2011 home opener on April 8, 2011.

At the suggestion of Paul Shaffer, Cook was invited in August 2011 to be a guest on Late Show with David Letterman, where she discussed satellite radio and growing up in Florida. She considered starring in a CBS sitcom about a single mother whose life is disrupted by the arrival of her criminal father, but the show never came to fruition. In June 2012 Cook returned to the Late Show to perform with Jason Isbell. American Songwriter notes that they sang covers of Townes Van Zandt's "Pancho and Lefty" and "Tecumseh Valley". On March 14, 2013, she appeared a third time on the Late Show with David Letterman and was interviewed by Letterman. She worked extensively with Carlene Carter on Carter's tenth studio album, Carter Girl.  On June 2, 2014, she appeared a fourth time on Late Show with David Letterman, performing Lou Reed's "Pale Blue Eyes".

In 2016, Cook released her sixth studio album, Exodus of Venus.

Starting in 2020, Cook began hosting Upstream with Elizabeth Cook, a fishing show on the Circle network.

On September 11, 2020, she released the album Aftermath.

She can also be heard on select episodes of the Adult Swim series Squidbillies, where she voices Tammi.

Radio show
Cook hosts the mid-day radio show "Elizabeth Cook's Apron Strings" on the Sirius XM radio station Outlaw Country. She has been nominated for two Ameripolitan Music Awards for her radio work.

Personal life
After Welder was released, she and Carroll divorced, and she lost her family farm. In addition, her father, mother, brother, mother-in-law and brother-in-law died during this period.  She cancelled an upcoming tour and entered rehab.

Cook later said, "I needed some help. I did not feel like rehab was what I needed and I tried to desperately convince some key people around me that in that moment I needed intensive therapy and I probably needed medication. They cancelled the tour and said you can't go because we don't trust the state that you're in. You're saying you're not addicted to anything and you're saying you don't have an eating disorder but we don't know that". She was critical of the treatment she received during rehab.

Discography

Studio albums

Extended plays

Singles

Music videos

Guest appearances

Awards and nominations

Live radio appearances
 Bob Harris Country, BBC Radio 2, July 8, 2010. Cook performed 3 songs live: "All The Time", "El Camino", "My Heroin Addict Sister".
 The Back Road Radio Show, Indianapolis, IN 91.9FM WITT, Cook did a Live Interview/>

References

External links
 
 
 Elizabeth Cook CMT artist main
 Elizabeth Cook Interview on The Back Road Radio Show in Indianapolis, Indiana on 6/2/2010
 Elizabeth Cook Once Again Graces 'The Late Show with David Letterman'

1972 births
20th-century American singers
20th-century American women singers
21st-century American singers
21st-century American women singers
American country singer-songwriters
American women country singers
American women singer-songwriters
American people of English descent
Country musicians from Florida
Living people
People from Wildwood, Florida
Singer-songwriters from Florida
Warner Records artists
Thirty Tigers artists